Kirkhill or Kirkhills may refer to a number of places.

In Canada:
Kirkhill, Nova Scotia
Kirkhill, Ontario, an area of North Glengarry

In Northern Ireland:
Kirkhills, a townland in County Antrim

In Scotland:
Kirkhill industrial estate, near Dyce and Aberdeen Airport
Kirkhill, Angus, a location
Kirkhill, East Renfrewshire, a district of the town of Newton Mearns
Kirkhill, Highland, a village near Beauly in Inverness-shire
Kirkhill, West Lothian, an area of the town of Broxburn
Kirkhill, Midlothian, an area of the town of Penicuik
Kirkhill Pendicle, a hamlet near Maud, Aberdeenshire, with a weather station appearing on Met Office maps
Kirkhill, South Lanarkshire, an area of the town of Cambuslang
Kirkhill railway station